Eve  is an English given name for a female, derived from the Latin name Eva, in turn originating with the Hebrew  (Chavah/Havah – chavah, to breathe, and chayah, to live, or to give life). The traditional meaning of Eve is life or "living". It can also mean full of life and mother of life.

History
The name has much religious significance in the Abrahamic religions. Eve, according to Abrahamic tradition, is widely beloved as the mother of all of mankind. She was the first woman that God created, and she was both the wife and companion of Adam.

Eve is described as being named Havah in the Torah

The Catholic Church by ancient tradition recognizes both Adam and Eve (in Latin: Adam et Eva) as saints. And the traditional liturgical feast of Saints Adam and Eve was celebrated on December 24 since the Middle Ages. Eve is first found as a name being used in England in the 12th century. However, the name did not gain much popularity until the Protestant Reformation. As discussed in Kathleen M. Crowther's Adam and Eve in the Protestant Reformation: "The story of Adam and Eve, ubiquitous in the art and literature of the period, played a central role in the religious controversies of sixteenth-century Europe... The story of Adam and Eve was of fundamental importance to sixteenth-century Protestant reformers who sought to ground Christian belief and salvation in the free grace of God..."

In pre-Reformation England the usage of the name Eve was most commonly associated with Jews, who used the form of Chavah/Havah. The name in the form of Haya (also spelled Haiya, Chaya, or less commonly, Kaya) and Haim are also derived from the root of Chavah/Havah; all variations being commonly found throughout the world, especially the Middle East, to this day. Famous examples of individuals with such names are Princess Haya of Jordan, Haim Saban, and Victor Raúl Haya de la Torre.

The name Evelyn itself is derived from Eve, and was one of the most popular names for girls between 1910 and 1930.

People called Eve

Given name 

 Eve (entertainer) (born 1978), American hip-hop artist and actor
 Eve Ai (born 1987), Taiwanese singer-songwriter
 Eve Arden (1908–1990), American actress
 Eve Beglarian (born 1958), Armenian-American composer
 Eve Brodlique (1867-1949), British-born Canadian/American author, journalist
 Eve Carson (1985-2008), American university student and murder victim: Murder of Eve Carson
 Eve Ensler (born 1953), American playwright
 Eve Gardiner (1913–1992), English beautician and remedial make-up artist
 Eve Jobs (born 1998), American fashion model; daughter of Steve Jobs and Laurene Powell Jobs
 Eve Muirhead (born 1990), Scottish curler
 Eve Myles (born 1978), Welsh actress
 Eve Oja (1948–2019), Estonian mathematician
 Eve Pancharoen (born 1981), Thai singer-songwriter
 Ève Paul-Margueritte (1885-1971), French novelist, translator
 Eve Pollard (born 1945), British journalist
 Eve Plumb (born 1958), American actor and painter
 Eve Queler (born 1931), American conductor
 Eve Kosofsky Sedgwick (1950–2009), American queer theorist
 Eve Torres (born 1984), professional wrestler

Chava (Hebrew form)

 Chava Alberstein, Israeli singer
Chava Lifshitz (1936–2005), Austrian-Israeli chemist
 Chava Rosenfarb, Yiddish writer
 Chava Shapiro, Volhynian Jewish writer

Surname
 Alice Eve (born 1982), British actress
 Angus Eve (born 1973), Trinidadian football (soccer) player
 Arthur Eve (born 1933), American politician
 Arthur Stewart Eve (1862–1948), English physicist
 Harry Trelawney Eve (1856–1940), English barrister, judge and politician
 Laverne Eve (born 1965), Bahamian javelin thrower
 Leecia Eve (born 1964), American attorney and politician
 Lisvel Elisa Eve (born 1991), Dominican Republic volleyball player
 Maria Louise Eve (1848-?), American poet
 Nomi Eve (born 1968), American author
 Trevor Eve (born 1951), British actor

Transliterations of Eve 
Arabic: حواء (Hawa)
Albanian: Eva / Hava
Armenian: Eva
Breton: Eva
Catalan: Eva
Chinese: 夏娃
Czech: Eva
Estonian: Eve, Eeva, Evi
Ge'ez: Hiwan
Finnish: Eeva, Eevi
German: Eva
Greek: Εύα (Eva)
French: Ève
Japanese: イブ (Ibu)/ エバ (Eba)
Hebrew: חוה Chava/ Hava / Hawa (ancient pronunciation)
Hungarian: Éva
Icelandic: Eva
Irish: Éabha, Aoibhe
Italian: Eva
Latin: Eva (or, Heva)
Lithuanian and Latvian: Ieva, Īva, Eva, Evita
Old English: Éfe
Pashto: حوا
Polish: Ewa
Persian: حوا
Portuguese: Eva
Romanian: Eva
Russian: Eвa (Yeva)/ Эва (Ehva)
Serbian: Eva/Eвa
Slovenian: Eva
Spanish: Eva
Swahili: Eva, Hawa
Tagalog: Eba
Telugu: హవ్వ (Havva)   
Turkish: Havva
Ukrainian: Єва
Welsh: Efa
Korean: 이브
Yoruba: Efa
Urdu: حوا
Sindhi: حوا

See also
 Eve (disambiguation)
 Hawa (given name)

References 

 Behind The Name
 Etymology Online

English feminine given names
English-language feminine given names
Hebrew feminine given names
Modern names of Hebrew origin